Events from the year 1812 in Sweden

Incumbents
 Monarch – Charles XIII

Events
 23 February  - Elise Frösslind, makes her breakthrough in the success of Cendrillon by Charles Etienne on the Royal Swedish Opera in Stockholm. 
 24 March - Treaty of Saint Petersburg (1812).
 30 May - The Magic Flute by Wolfgang Amadeus Mozart on the Royal Swedish Opera in Stockholm. 
 8 July - Treaty of Örebro.
 - Inauguration of Askersunds flickskola in Askersund.
 - A new law permit forced examination of any one suspected of carrying sexual transmitted disease. 
 - Sorgespelet Prins Gustaf, by Lorenzo Hammarsköld
 - Flyttfåglarna, by Esaias Tegnér

Births
 22 February - Emily Nonnen, writer  (died 1905)
 20 April - Maria Paulina Åhman, harpist, the first female instrumentalist in the royal chapel  (died 1904)
 29 April - Emilie Högqvist, actress   (died 1846)
 19 May - Herman Sätherberg, poet and physician  (died 1892)
 30 June - Josabeth Sjöberg, artist  (died 1882)
 29 October – Louise Granberg, playwright, translator and theatre director  (died 1907)
 Carolina Lindström, milliner  (died 1892)
 4 May - Amalia Redec, pianist and composer (died 1885)

Deaths

 Hedda Piper, courtier (born 1746)

References

 
Years of the 19th century in Sweden
Sweden